"Peace for our time" was a declaration made by British Prime Minister Neville Chamberlain in his 30 September 1938 remarks in London concerning the Munich Agreement and the subsequent Anglo-German Declaration. The phrase echoed Benjamin Disraeli, who, upon returning from the Congress of Berlin in 1878, had stated, "I have returned from Germany with peace for our time."

The phrase is primarily remembered for its bitter ironic value since less than a year after the agreement, Hitler's invasion of Poland began World War II.

It is often misquoted as "peace in our time", a phrase already familiar to the British public by its longstanding appearance in the Book of Common Prayer. A passage in that book translated from the 7th-century hymn "Da pacem Domine" reads, "Give peace in our time, O Lord; because there is none other that fighteth for us, but only thou, O God." It is not known how deliberate Chamberlain's use of such a similar phrase was.

Speeches
Chamberlain's aeroplane landed at Heston Aerodrome on 30 September 1938 and he spoke to the crowds there:

The settlement of the Czechoslovakian problem, which has now been achieved is, in my view, only the prelude to a larger settlement in which all Europe may find peace. This morning I had another talk with the German Chancellor, Herr Hitler, and here is the paper which bears his name upon it as well as mine [shows paper to crowd]. Some of you, perhaps, have already heard what it contains but I would just like to read it to you: " ... We regard the agreement signed last night and the Anglo-German Naval Agreement as symbolic of the desire of our two peoples never to go to war with one another again".

Later that day, he stood outside 10 Downing Street, again read from the document and concluded:

My good friends, for the second time in our history, a British Prime Minister has returned from Germany bringing peace with honour. I believe it is peace for our time. We thank you from the bottom of our hearts. Go home and get a nice quiet sleep.

Chamberlain's return was not universally well-received, and 15,000 people protested against the Munich Agreement the same day in Trafalgar Square, three times more than the number welcoming him at 10 Downing Street. Chamberlain's ongoing manipulation of the BBC caused that news to be largely suppressed. The Labour spokesman Hugh Dalton publicly suggested that the piece of paper that Chamberlain was waving was "torn from the pages of Mein Kampf."

Disbelieving Chamberlain, Isaac Asimov published in July 1939 "Trends", which mentions a World War in 1940. He later wrote "I was too conservative" (about when war would begin).

Cultural references
Peace in Our Time is the title of a 1947 stage play by Noël Coward. Set in an alternative 1940, the Battle of Britain has been lost, the Germans have supremacy in the air and the United Kingdom is under Nazi occupation. Inspired to write this play in 1946 after seeing the effects of the occupation of France Coward wrote: "I began to suspect the physical effect of four years' intermittent bombing is far less damaging to the intrinsic character of a nation than the spiritual effect of four years of enemy occupation".

"Peace in Our Time" is a 1984 satirical song by Elvis Costello which references Chamberlain. It is featured on the album Goodbye Cruel World.

U.S. President John F. Kennedy alluded to the speech in his 1963 American University commencement address in which he sought "not merely peace in our time, but peace in all time."

Monty Python's 1969 The Funniest Joke in the World sketch references "Britain's pre-war joke" and shows an image of Chamberlain holding up the Munich Agreement paper.

In the 2015 Marvel Cinematic Universe film Avengers: Age of Ultron, Tony Stark uses the phrase "Peace in our time" after creating the eponymous and seemingly benevolent artificial intelligence. Since this backfires, the phrase bears similar ironic value to Chamberlain’s utterance.

Robyn Hitchcock’s 1990 song “Cynthia Mask” references the incident in the lyrics of its second verse.

See also
A total and unmitigated defeat
Appeasement
Dewey Defeats Truman
European foreign policy of the Chamberlain ministry
Mission Accomplished speech
Political gaffe
Western betrayal

References

External links
Peace in our Time. Speech given in Defense of the Munich Agreement, 1938 – online text of the speech
The Anglo-German Declaration

1938 in international relations
1938 in the United Kingdom
1938 in London
British political phrases
English phrases
History of the foreign relations of the United Kingdom
Neville Chamberlain
Munich Agreement
1930s neologisms
History of Middlesex
History of the London Borough of Hounslow